Gopinath Chandran is an Indian television anchor, radio jockey, journalist, reporter, news presenter/moderator, entrepreneur, and a writer, currently featured on the STAR Vijay debate show Neeya Naana. He is popularly known as "Neeya Naana Gopinath."

Early life
Gopinath was born in Aranthangi, Pudukkottai district, Tamil Nadu to Chandran and Kumudham Chandran in 1975

Career
Gopinath began his career in 1997 with United Television and later he went on to join Raj Television Network.  He did reporting assignments for Jaya TV, NDTV and CNBC TV-18. Later he joined Vijay TV and anchored Makkal Yaar Pakkam, a political analysis programme. In 2006, he started his position with Neeya Naana.

He has been an anchor for television series such as Makkal Yaar pakkam, Nadanthadhu enna?, Sigaram thotta Manidargal and En Desam! En Makkal in 2013.

He was a radio jockey (RJ) at Radio City, and hosted their breakfast shows.

He has written five books. The first was a collection of poems, Theruvellam Devathaigal, and was published in 2007. The second book, Please indha Puthagathai vaangatheenga was based on personality development which is still topping the charts and has sold over 4 lakh copies till date. The third was a self-motivating and self-analysing book called Neeyum Naanum. Gopinath's fourth book is Ner Ner Thema, a collection of interviews. The recent book "Nimirnthu Nil" was published in Nakkeeran, Tamil Weekly and later got published in 2015. Of all his works he quotes PASSWORD as the one that is close to his heart.

He also wrote a series of articles with the title  in Aananda Vikatan. It is known for its scripted motivation.
This article was translated into English as "You And Me".

Television works

Filmography

References

People from Pudukkottai district
Living people
Television personalities from Tamil Nadu
Indian television presenters
1975 births